Abu Dhabi National Hotels is a broad-based hotel, tourism, transport and catering group, part of which is owned by the Abu Dhabi government.

The company's hotel division acts as a hotel developer and operator - partnering with Hilton, Sheraton, Sofitel and Meridien for some of its flagship properties. Whilst the majority of Abu Dhabi National Hotel's properties are located in Abu Dhabi, the company is expanding aggressively across the UAE. As of 2012, within the hotel and hotel apartment sector the company owned over 15 properties located in Abu Dhabi, Al Ain, Dubai, Sharjah and Fujairah.

Timeline
1976: Abu Dhabi National Hotels was founded with a portfolio of three hotels acquired from the government.
1986: Sunshine Travel & Tours has been established as a pioneering initiative aimed at creating a tourism division.
1988: Al Ghazal Transport has been the first luxury transportation company in the Emirate.
1991: Al Diar Hotels was the first homegrown operator and the first management contract was signed.
2001: ADNH Compass was formed as a joint venture with the United Kingdom-based Compass Group PLC to cover catering demands across a wide range of industry sectors.

References

External links
 

Companies based in Abu Dhabi
Hotel chains in the United Arab Emirates